Chifeng Yulong Airport  is an airport serving Chifeng, a city in the autonomous region of Inner Mongolia in China.

Facilities

Airlines and destinations

See also
 List of airports in China

References

Airports in Inner Mongolia
Chifeng